Yayıklı is a village in the Adıyaman District, Adıyaman Province, Turkey. The village had a population of 582 in 2021.

References 

Villages in Besni District
Kurdish settlements in Adıyaman Province